The Pakistani cricket team toured New Zealand in January 2016 to play three One Day Internationals (ODIs) and three Twenty20 International (T20Is) matches. New Zealand won the T20I series 2–1 and the ODI series 2–0.

Squads

BJ Watling joined New Zealand's squad for the 2nd and 3rd ODIs. Brendon McCullum joined the squad for the 3rd ODI. New Zealand's Mitchell McClenaghan suffered an eye injury during the first ODI and was ruled out of the rest of the series. He was replaced by Doug Bracewell.

T20I series

1st T20I

2nd T20I

3rd T20I

ODI series

1st ODI

2nd ODI

3rd ODI

References

External links
 Series home at ESPN Cricinfo

2016 in Pakistani cricket
2016 in New Zealand cricket
International cricket competitions in 2015–16
Pakistani cricket tours of New Zealand